The Oregon Shortline Railroad Company Building in Salt Lake City, Utah, was built in 1897–98.  It was listed on the National Register of Historic Places in 1976.

It is a complex of three buildings, connected and all two-storied.  The west-most one, at 134–142 Pierpont, was the original Salt Lake High School.

It was architect Carl M. Neuhausen's first major commission, and its success greatly propelled his career.

References

		
National Register of Historic Places in Salt Lake City
Renaissance Revival architecture in Utah
Buildings and structures completed in 1897